Fayz Al-Sabiay (born 9 October 1982) is a Saudi football player. He currently plays as a goalkeeper for Al-Taawoun.

Club career statistics

Honours

Al-Khaleej
Saudi First Division: 2005–06

Al-Hilal
King Cup: 2015

References

External links
 

1982 births
Ettifaq FC players
Ittihad FC players
Living people
Saudi Arabian footballers
Khaleej FC players
Al Hilal SFC players
Al-Taawoun FC players
Al-Raed FC players
Saudi First Division League players
Saudi Professional League players
Association football goalkeepers